The  2018 Assyrian elections in Iraq were the first elections since the Islamic State invasion of Iraq, including the Assyrian heartland, the Nineveh Plains in August 2014. A parliamentary election will be held in Iraq on 12 May 2018. Of the 329 seats in the Iraqi parliament, 5 are reserved for the Christian minorities. The five reserved seats are separated one for each governorate of: Baghdad, Duhok, Erbil, Kirkuk and Nineveh. At the time of voting, only about 200,000 Assyrians remained in the country.

Going into the elections, Assyrian Democratic Movement has two seats, Chaldean Syriac Assyrian Popular Council has two seats, and one by the Iraqi Communist Party. A total of seven lists comprising 67 candidates will compete for the reserved seats. At the time of elections, the Assyrian community was "divided and messy". For the first time in Iraqi history, a Church has officially backed a list, as Chaldean Catholic Patriarch Louis Sako openly urged his followers to vote for the 139 list.

In mid-May 2018, the Iraqi Higher Elector Commission released the results showing a surprise win for the Babylon Movement, a newly formed party by the Shia Islamist militant group Hashd al-Shaabi. The results were seen as unexpected by the Assyrian community, as many complained of outright fraud, where most of votes of Babylon Movement came from Shia Arabs tied to Badr Organization.

Lists
113 - Chaldean Syriac Assyrian Popular Council
115 - United Bet Nahrain List  (Beth Nahren Patriotic Union (BNPU), Iraqi Communist Party (ICP), Kaldo-Ashur Communist Party (KACP), Bet Nahrain Democratic Party (BNDP)
131 - Syriac Assembly Movement
139 - Chaldean Alliance List (Chaldean National Congress, Chaldean Democratic Party and independents)
144 - Rafidain List (Assyrian Democratic Movement (ADM) Assyrian Patriotic Party (APP) and independents)
154 - Sons of Mesopotamia and independents 
166 - Babylon Movement (founded by Hashd al-Shaabi leader Rayan Kildani)

Results

Results by settlement

Baqofah

Tesqopa

References

2018 elections in Iraq
Assyrians in Iraq